Nicolas Dalla Valle (born 13 September 1997) is an Italian racing cyclist, who currently rides for UCI ProTeam .

Major results
2015
 1st  Mountains classification, Trophée Centre Morbihan
 3rd La Piccola San Remo
 5th GP Dell'Arno
2018
 3rd La Popolarissima
2019
 2nd Road race, National Under-23 Road Championships
 10th GP Adria Mobil
2022
 Tour of Szeklerland
1st  Points classification
1st Stages 1 & 5
 3rd Grand Prix Megasaray
 9th Overall Tour of Romania
 10th Grand Prix Justiniano Hotels

References

External links

1997 births
Living people
Italian male cyclists
Sportspeople from Padua
Cyclists from the Province of Padua